WNJK (105.9 FM, "Jess FM") is an adult contemporary formatted broadcast radio station licensed to Burgin, Kentucky, serving Nicholasville, Richmond, Danville, and Lexington in Kentucky.  WNJK is owned and operated by Choice Radio NJK Corporation.

Live Sports
Wilmore, Kentucky-based Asbury University (AU), entered into an agreement with Choice Radio Corporation, on November 16, 2018.  WNJK would carry AU's men's and women's basketball games live, along with the "Asbury Sports Minute", airing twice daily.  During AU's 2019/2020 athletic season, WNJK will add live coverage of baseball and softball games to the broadcast docket, which includes men's and women's basketball games.

References

External links

2010 establishments in Kentucky
Mainstream adult contemporary radio stations in the United States
Radio stations established in 2010
NJK
Mercer County, Kentucky